Viyabari is a 2007 Indian Tamil-language science fiction comedy film directed and produced by Sakthi Chidambaram. The film stars S. J. Suryah in a dual role as a businessman and his clone. It also stars Tamannaah, Prakash Raj, Namitha, Malavika, Vadivelu, Santhanam, Seetha, and Nassar. The musical score was composed by Deva. Cinematography was by M. V. Panneerselvam. The editor was S. Suraj Kavee.

The film was released on 11 July 2007. It opened to moderate reviews, and average at the box office. It is loosely based on 1996 American science fiction comedy film Multiplicity, starring Michael Keaton and Andie MacDowell.

Synopsis
Suryaprakash (S. J. Suryah) is a businessman who wants to become richer than Bill Gates. In the process, he lose his family and social life. He tells scientist Stephen Raj (Nassar) to clone him so that he can keep concentrating on his business affairs whilst the clone replaces him at home. Savithri (Tamannaah), a college girl doing a research project on Suryaprakash, falls in love with him. Suryaprakash is not interested in Savithri, but marries her because she's a good cook. After partying with two models (Namitha and Malavika) and humiliating his brother-in-law "Digil" Paandi (Vadivelu), Suryaprakash finally comes to understand the value of family after his mother (Seetha) dies.

Cast

Controversy
It was rumoured that Malavika complained to the Nadigar Sangam against SJ Suryah for alleged sexual harassment. Suryah subsequently apologized for his behaviour. Later Malavika clarified that the incident had never occurred.

Music

Reception

Critical response
Indiaglitz wrote: "Sakthi Chidambaram has used the concept of cloning well to suit the commercial needs of the movie. Sakthi has narrated the tale of motherly sentiment laced with all commercial elements." Sify criticized the film and asked "what the actor and his director was trying to convey through this film — a bit of sleaze and fun or steamy mother sentiments?"

References

External links
 

2007 films
Films scored by Deva (composer)
Films about cloning
Indian science fiction comedy films
2000s science fiction comedy films
2000s Tamil-language films
2007 comedy films
Films directed by Sakthi Chidambaram